In an archipelago like the Hawaiian Islands the water between islands is typically called a channel or passage. Described here are the channels between the islands of Hawaiʻi, arranged from northwest to southeast.

Kaulakahi Channel 

The Kaulakahi Channel separates the islands of Niʻihau and Kauaʻi. Kaulakahi translates to "the single flame (streak of color)."

Kaʻieʻie Waho Channel 

Kaʻieʻie Waho means "Outer Kaʻieʻie," named after the ʻieʻie vine (Freycinetia arborea). The maximum depth of the channel is over 11000 feet.

Kaiwi Channel 

Ka Iwi means "the bone." There are annual paddleboarding and outrigger canoe paddling contests which traverse this channel; swimming the channel is one of the seven challenges in the Oceans Seven open water swimming series.

Kalohi Channel 

The Kalohi Channel is the stretch of water separating Lānaʻi and Molokaʻi. This is one of the less treacherous channels between islands in the archipelago, although strong winds and choppy sea conditions are frequent. Kalolohia Beach on the Lānaʻi coast is also known as "Shipwreck Beach" because of a wreck on the reef there. Kalohi means "the slowness."

Pailolo Channel 
The Pailolo Channel separates the islands of Molokaʻi and Maui. Some  at its narrowest, it is one of the windiest and roughest in the Hawaiian Islands.

ʻAuʻau Channel 

The ʻAuʻau Channel is one of the most protected areas of ocean in the Hawaiian Islands, lying between Lānaʻi and Maui. The channel is also protected by Molokaʻi to the north, and Kahoʻolawe to the south. Humpback whales migrate approximately 3,500 miles (5600 km) from Alaskan waters each autumn and spend the northern hemisphere winter months in the protected waters of the channel.

ʻAuʻau translates to "to take a bath," referring to its calm bath-like conditions.

Kealaikahiki Channel 
The Kealaikahiki Channel is the 17 mile channel between Lānaʻi and Kahoʻolawe. It literally means "the road to Tahiti", both figuratively and literally, as Tahiti lies generally southward of its orientation.  Known informally as the "Tahiti Express" for its strength in that direction.

ʻAlalākeiki Channel 
The ʻAlalākeiki Channel separates the islands of Kahoʻolawe and Maui, at a distance of 7 miles. ʻAlalākeiki means "crying baby."

ʻAlenuihāhā Channel 

The ʻAlenuihāhā separates the island of Hawaiʻi and the island of Maui. There is a significant wind funnel effect in the channel, which is subject to scientific investigations. ʻAlenuihāhā means "great billows smashing."

Minor Channels and Alternate Names

Lahaina Roads 

The middle of the ʻAuʻau channel off Lahaina is known as the Lahaina Roads. Once filled with whalers when Lahaina was a capital for that industry, Lahaina Roads were later adopted as an alternate anchorage for the main U.S. Pacific Fleet based at Pearl Harbor. However, Lahaina was not used, and the bulk of the fleet remained moored in Pearl Harbor. The Roads are still a common moorage for oceangoing cruise ships and naval vessels of many flags, including the U.S., whose passengers and crews add to the tourists visiting the island.

Kumukahi Channel 
The Kumukahi Channel separates the islands of Niʻihau and Lehua. Kumukahi means "first beginning."

Hoʻomoʻa Channel 
The Hoʻomoʻa Channel separates the islands of Lehua and Nihoa. Hoʻomoʻa means "to cook."

Hawaiʻiloa Channel 
The Hawaiʻiloa Channel to the northwest of the islands of Nihoa. Named after Hawaiʻiloa, hero of an ancient Hawaiian legend about the settling of the Hawaiian Islands.

References

Sources 
 
 

Channels of Hawaii